The 2002 California wildfires were a series of wildfires that were active in the state of California during the year 2002. In total, there were 8,328 fires that burned  of land.

Fires
Below is a list of fires that exceeded  or caused a notable amount of damage during the 2002 fire season. The list is taken from CAL FIRE's list of large fires.

References

 
Wildfires 2002
California, 2002
2002